Gypsum is a soft mineral composed of calcium sulfate dihydrate.

Gypsum may also refer to:

Places
 Gypsum, Bhutan, a village

United States
 Gypsum, Colorado, a home rule municipality
 Gypsum, Kansas, a city
 Gypsum Township, Saline County, Kansas
 Gypsum Township, Sedgwick County, Kansas
 Gypsum, Ohio, an unincorporated community
 Gypsum Creek, a stream in Kansas
 Gypsum Wash, a wash or stream in Nevada

See also
 Richard Gypson (c. 1811 – ?), English balloonist